Olisovo is a rural locality (a village) in Lukinskoye Rural Settlement, Chagodoshchensky District, Vologda Oblast, Russia. The population was 14 as of 2002.

Geography 
Sirotovo is the nearest rural locality.

References 

Rural localities in Chagodoshchensky District